Arran Fernandez (born June 1995) is a British mathematician who, in June 2013, became Senior Wrangler at Cambridge University, aged 18 years and 0 months. He is thought to be the youngest Senior Wrangler ever.

Biography 
Prior to university, Fernandez was educated at home, predominantly by his father, Neil Fernandez. In 2001 he broke the age record for gaining a General Certificate of Secondary Education (GCSE), the English academic qualification usually taken at age 16, for which he sat the examinations aged five. In 2003 he became the youngest person ever to gain an A* grade at GCSE, also for Mathematics.

In October 2010, when Fernandez began studying the Cambridge Mathematical Tripos aged 15 years and 3 months, he was the youngest Cambridge University undergraduate since William Pitt the Younger in 1773.

Fernandez believes it was his exceptional environment rather than exceptional nature, that enabled him to achieve his academic successes. "Everything I achieved is because of my education and the opportunities I had. And the big part of my story is that I never went to school. My parents never believed in the official education system." In a 2020 interview with Raidio Teilifis Eireann he stated his opinion that a large number of people could achieve at the same level if they had the same opportunities as he did, and that those opportunities "would have to start at a very young age", such as at two years old.

Starting in 2000 (aged five) Fernandez had several sequences published in the On-Line Encyclopedia of Integer Sequences (OEIS), the number theory database established by Neil Sloane. Since 2017, he has had more than 20 mathematical research articles published in peer-reviewed international journals.

Television work featuring Fernandez has included an appearance as a "Person of the Week" on Frank Elstner's talk show on German TV in 2001, and an appearance on Terry Wogan’s and 
Gaby Roslin's The Terry and Gaby Show on British TV in 2003, when he beat mathematics populariser Johnny Ball in a live mental arithmetic contest, successfully extracting the fifth roots of several large integers.

In September 2018, having completed master's and doctoral degrees at the University of Cambridge, Fernandez joined the faculty of the Eastern Mediterranean University in Northern Cyprus as an assistant professor of mathematics, where in 2022 he became an associate professor. His main research areas are in fractional calculus and analytic number theory.

References

1995 births
Living people
Alumni of Fitzwilliam College, Cambridge
Alumni of Clare Hall, Cambridge
British mathematicians
Senior Wranglers